William Willis (1794–1870) was a Portland, Maine lawyer, historian, and politician, and was the partner of William Pitt Fessenden. He was member of the Maine State Senate in 1855 and Mayor of Portland, Maine in 1857, president of the Maine Historical Society (1856–1865), and president of the Maine Central Railroad. In 1864 he was elected a member of the American Antiquarian Society.

Bowdoin College, which granted him an honorary degree in 1867, has a small collection of his correspondence, drafts of his writing, and estate information.

Selected bibliography

References

External links
Shade Trees — an exert from History of Portland, By William Willis written in 1864
Mayors of Portland, Maine
www.geocities.com

1794 births
1870 deaths
Maine lawyers
Republican Party Maine state senators
Mayors of Portland, Maine
Historians of Maine
Harvard College alumni
Members of the American Antiquarian Society
Politicians from Haverhill, Massachusetts
Phillips Exeter Academy alumni
19th-century American politicians
19th-century American lawyers